Confessions of an Indian Teenager is an Indian teen drama television series aired on Channel V India. The series deals with the problems of teenagers in modern Indian society and each episode ends with a moral. The series premiered on 25 November 2013. and is produced by Balaji Telefilms.

Cast
 Vaibhav Sharma
Nitesh Choudhary
 Rohan Shah
 Karan Jotwani
 Alam Khan
 Annie Gill
 Mohak Meet
 Lehar Khan
 Kshitija Saxena as Kajal
Vishal Jethwa
Barkha Singh
 Sneha Namanandi

References

External links
Official Website on Hotstar

Balaji Telefilms television series
Channel V India original programming
2013 Indian television series debuts
Indian teen drama television series
2014 Indian television series endings
Television series about teenagers